McLaren Applied Limited is a British technology company that manufactures Electronic Control Units and parts such as engine temperature and pressure sensors for F1 teams. The company currently works in three industries: motorsport, automotive, transport and mining. 

In September 2014, Ian Rhodes replaced the founder, Ron Dennis, as CEO of the company. McLaren Applied was initially known as "McLaren Composites", its main work being the manufacture of parts for the McLaren F1 and Mercedes SLR. However, it also won contracts to manufacture parts for other companies and moved into the energy industry, mainly solar panels. It was dissolved in 2003 and replaced with "McLaren Applied Technologies" a short while after in 2004.In 2021 McLaren Group sold the company to Greybull Capital.

History
The company was formed when two McLaren Technology Group companies merged - McLaren Composites and TAG Electronics. The companies merged due to the sale of Audiolab to International Audio Group. TAG Electronics Holdings was the parent company of TAGMcLaren Audio (Now Audiolab) and also TAG Electronics Systems. When Audiolab was sold, the holding company TAG Electronics Holdings was scrapped and the remaining technology company merged with McLaren Composites, which both together then formed McLaren Applied Technologies. 

The company name was changed again on 2 January 2020 to McLaren Applied Limited.

Business model
McLaren Applied works in three performance areas: systems, equipment, and modelling and simulation.

Clients include teams and companies in sports, health and wellness, defence, motorsports and automotive sectors.

In 2010, McLaren Applied developed systems that supported Team GB's 2012 London Olympics medal bids in rowing, sailing and cycling.

McLaren Applied worked with Specialized Bicycle Components to produce the Specialized S-Works+McLaren Venge racing bike, as ridden by Mark Cavendish.

GlaxoSmithKline (GSK) worked with McLaren Applied on developing drugs, vaccines and medication. McLaren Applied also helps develop some household brands of GSK including Aquafresh, Horlicks, Sensodyne, NiQuitin and more. McLaren Applied enabled GSK's toothpaste production line at Maidenhead to cut the time it takes to change over one toothpaste brand or flavour to another from 39 minutes to 15 minutes, resulting in the factory becoming more productive to the tune of 6.7 million tubes of toothpaste a year.

Energy
McLaren Applied handles electronics and data for the Ekofisk drilling plant in the North Sea. The McLaren Applied ENERGY website states: "McLaren Applied has taken its knowledge of analysing large data sets and applied it to drilling.  Using real time data direct from the drilling head, the computer models developed by McLaren Applied constantly updates and provides insight that helps guide operational decision making on a day-to-day basis." 

McLaren Applied also works with Wind Turbines companies and data centre companies. More well known, McLaren Applied works with IO on the design of their data centres and cooling systems for IO.

Electronics
The company has won multiple Queen's Awards for Enterprise for innovation and international trade. McLaren Applied have supplied the single electronic control unit used in all Formula One cars since 2008, and also supply software, sensors and other components to Formula One teams. MES also supply the powertrain control system used in McLaren's Formula One race cars.

In addition to Formula One, McLaren Applied also provides the engine control units used in the NASCAR Sprint Cup  and IndyCar Series. The two ECU's share a common base, and McLaren Applied have held the contract for IndyCar series since 2007 later 2010 as a standard ECU supplier (previously IndyCar's ECU supplier was Motorola) and NASCAR Cup Series since 2012, who were also switching to fuel injection from carburation, had left an open choice. McLaren Applied produced the electric motor, transmission and electronics used in the Spark-Renault SRT 01E, the car used in the inaugural Formula E season.

References

McLaren Group
Engineering companies of England
Technology companies of England
2004 establishments in England
Electronics companies established in 2004
Companies based in Surrey
Woking